Ryutist is a Japanese idol girl group formed in 2011. They made their major label debut in 2017 with their second studio album, Ryuto Geigi.

Members

Current
Muu Ikarashi (五十嵐夢羽)
Tomoe Uno (宇野友恵)
Satō Nonoko (佐藤乃々子)
Miku Yokoyama (横山実郁)

Former
Yūri Kimura (木村優里)
Wakana Ōishi (大石若奈)

Discography

Studio albums

Live albums

Singles

References

External links
Official website

Japanese girl groups
Japanese idol groups
Japanese pop music groups
Musical groups from Tokyo
Musical groups established in 2011
2011 establishments in Japan